Sage's rock rat (Aconaemys sagei) is a species of rodent in the family Octodontidae. It is found in Argentina and possibly Chile.

References

Aconaemys
Mammals of Argentina
Mammals of Chile
Mammals described in 1984
Taxa named by Oliver Payne Pearson
Taxonomy articles created by Polbot